Oloessa is a genus of longhorn beetles of the subfamily Lamiinae, containing the following species:

 Oloessa bianor Dillon & Dillon, 1952
 Oloessa cenea Dillon & Dillon, 1952
 Oloessa minuta Pascoe, 1864
 Oloessa poeta Dillon & Dillon, 1952

References

Cyrtinini